Holy Trinity Catholic High School is a Roman Catholic middle school / high school operated in Fort McMurray, Alberta by the Fort McMurray Catholic School District. It includes a Suncor Energy Performing Arts Theatre used for both school and general purposes. Class start times begin at 8:10 with each block lasting 60 minutes for the junior high students, and 90 minutes for the high school students. Class end times is at 2:54 for junior high and 3:00 for senior high. The overall school attendance was 1335 students, for the 2020-2021 school year. Due to physical restraints and a growing population class sizes tend to be large.

Name
Holy Trinity is named by the three sections of the trinity, The Father, The Son, and The Holy Spirit.

Sports

The school's sports teams are known as the "Northern Knights"; the mascot is a knight (logo is a knight chess piece).

Suncor Energy Center for Performing Arts

The creation of the facility was funded with the assistance of Suncor Energy and the Regional Municipality of Wood Buffalo who donated $4.5 Million to incorporate a Performing Arts Centre in Holy Trinity High School's Design.
The centre will serve Holy Trinity and the Fort McMurray Catholic School District as a major instructional space, with many specialized programs focused on Visual and Performing Arts; and as a part of the Regional Municipality's continuing support, the centre will be a cultural hub open for community use.

Buildings and structures in Fort McMurray
Catholic secondary schools in Alberta
Educational institutions established in 2011
2011 establishments in Alberta